Gavin Dodd is a former Ireland international rugby league footballer.

Dodd plays for Swinton in National League One. He also plays for Ireland.

Gavin Dodd is also a useful goal-kicker.

Dodd has previously played for Oldham and Widnes, and was on the fringes of the first team at the Bradford Bulls.

Gavin Dodd had however been a revelation with Widnes, in 2007 scoring 21 tries in 21 games and also converting 28 attempts at goal. He holds the Widnes record for points in a game consisting of a hat-trick of tries and 13 goals vs Doncaster in 2007, his total was 38.

As of the 2010 season Dodd played for Swinton.

Dodd is an Ireland international, playing in the recent games against Russia and Lebanon.

He has been named in the Ireland training squad for the 2008 Rugby League World Cup.

Rugby union

In 2005-06 he had a trial with rugby union team Glasgow Warriors. He played in one game; a friendly against Newcastle Falcons academy side.

References

External links
Statistics at rugbyleagueproject.org
 

1981 births
Living people
English people of Irish descent
English rugby league players
English rugby union players
Glasgow Warriors players
Ireland national rugby league team players
Oldham R.L.F.C. players
Rugby articles needing expert attention
Rugby league centres
Rugby league fullbacks
Rugby league players from Manchester
Rugby league wingers
Rugby union players from Manchester
Swinton Lions players
Widnes Vikings players